John Pollock may refer to:
John A. Pollock (businessman) (born 1936), Canadian businessman, former chancellor of Wilfrid Laurier University
John D. Pollock (1926–1995), Scottish trade union leader
John L. Pollock (1940–2009), American philosopher (epistemologist)
John Pollock (author) (1924–2012), English Christian author, the official biographer of Billy Graham
John Pollock (politician) (1893–1955), Scottish politician and trade unionist
John Calvin Pollock (1857–1937), U.S. federal judge
John A. Pollock (professor) (21st century), American neurobiologist
John Donald Pollock (1868–1962), Scottish physician, industrialist and philanthropist
John C. Pollock (born 1943), American social scientist and communication scholar
Sir John Pollock, 4th Baronet (1878–1963), British historian, journalist and translator
John Pollock (Missing), fictional character in the Canadian drama series, Missing
John Pollock (journalist), Canadian combat sports journalist

See also
John C. Pollock House (built 1870), in Ohio, United States
John Pollack (born 1966), American writer